The Godavari-class frigates (formerly Type 16 or Project 16 frigates) were guided-missile frigates of the Indian Navy. The Godavari class was the first significant indigenous warship design and development initiative of the Indian Navy. The class and the lead ship,  were named after the Godavari River. Subsequent ships in the class,  and  also took their names from Indian rivers.

INS Gomati was the first Indian Navy vessel to have digital electronics in her combat data system. The ships combined Indian, Russian and Western weapons systems.

History
The concept for the Godavari class originated from the lessons learnt in the Indo-Pakistan War of 1971. There was a need for a ship unique to Indian requirements, for deploying a hybrid of indigenously-designed, as well as Russian and European weapons systems. The keel of the lead ship INS Godavari was laid in 1978 at Mazagon Dock Limited in Bombay. She was commissioned in December 1983.

One of the requirements was to deploy two Sea King helicopters from the ship. The Nilgiri-class vessels were too small for this requirement. The final design incorporated a larger hull in order to accommodate this. INS Godavari was decommissioned on 23 December 2015, and her Barak 1 surface-to-air missile will be installed on the flagship . INS Ganga was retired from active service on 28 May 2017, and was decommissioned on 22 March 2018. The last ship of its class, INS Gomati, was decommissioned on 15 May 2022 after 34 years of service.

Design
Although the Directorate of Marine Engineering suggested replacing steam propulsion with gas turbines, it was decided not to do so, since Bharat Heavy Electricals Limited and Hindustan Aeronautics Limited had made heavy investments in facilities and tooling for design of steam turbines and auxiliary systems.

For armaments, the missile and gun package of the Soviet  was installed on the frigate.

Ships of the class

Upgrades
All three ships later underwent an extensive upgrade of weapons and sensors. These include the fitment of the Israeli Barak SAM system, and a new fire control system based on the EL/M-2221 STGR. The P-20 missiles have been retained for now.

Gallery

See also
 List of naval ship classes in service

References

 
Frigate classes
Ships built in India